Ayar may refer to:

Ayyar, a lunar month in the Arabic calendar, corresponding to Iyar in the Hebrew calendar, and May in the Gregorian calendar

Persons
Ayar Cachi, one of the brothers of Manco Cápac, who emerged from the cave at Paqariq Tampu
Mulu Ayar Bera, Indian politician, Member of Legislative assembly from Bhanvad constituency in Gujarat 
Kaan Ayar (born 1995), Turkish swimmer

Places
Ayar River or Ahar River, a tributary of the Berach River (itself a tributary of Banas River, which in turn is a tributary of Chambal river, itself a tributary of Yamuna River, which in turn is the most important tributary of Ganges River, India

See also
Ayyar (disambiguation)
Iyar (disambiguation)
Konar (caste), also known as Ayar and Idaiyar, an ethnic group from the Indian state of Tamil Nadu